Ledston is a village and civil parish  north of Castleford and  east of Leeds in the county of West Yorkshire, England. The village is in the City of Leeds metropolitan borough.  It had a population of 400 in 2001, which decreased slightly to 394 at the 2011 Census.

Ledston is first mentioned in 1086, and on through the Middle Ages, in forms like Ledestun(e), Ledestona. The name seems to refer to Leeds (or the Old English precursor of this name, Loidis, which denoted a region rather than a town), meaning the tūn ('settlement, estate') belonging to Leeds.

Mary Pannal of Ledston was executed in 1603 as an accused witch.

Ledston Hall

Ledston or Ledstone Hall was the home of Lady Elizabeth Hastings, daughter of the 7th Earl of Huntingdon, known as "Lady Betty". The hall was originally a grange and chapel built by the monks of Pontefract Priory.  It is a grade I listed building, and several associated buildings and garden features are also listed.

Ledston Hall featured in the television show Most Haunted:Live on 27 October 2007, but was called "Wheler Priory" for security reasons at the time (Wheler being the surname of the last family owning the hall).

Ledston is also home to the Ledston Equine Centre located in the stables of Ledston Hall.

Ledston lies to the east of the A656 road, and there was a railway station named after the village on the Castleford to Garforth line, though this station was actually adjacent to Allerton Bywater Colliery. The village also had a colliery named after it, Ledston Luck, which was connected to the railway via a narrow gauge railway line up to Peckfield Colliery in Micklefield. Ledston Luck Colliery closed in 1986 and the site is now a local nature reserve.

White Horse Inn 
The White Horse Inn is a 15th-century public house. It was 2019 regional winner of  North East Pubs in Bloom, and supports various local activities such as the Ledston in Bloom, a village scarecrow competition. and the Ledston christmas light switch on.

See also
Listed buildings in Ledston

References

External links

 
 
 
 
 

 
Places in Leeds
Villages in West Yorkshire
Civil parishes in West Yorkshire